The Strata Range is a subrange of the Skeena Mountains located between the Bell-Irving River and the Taylor River in northern British Columbia, Canada.

References

Strata Range in the Canadian Mountain Encyclopedia

Skeena Mountains